Kilchberg (High Alemannic: Chilchbèèrg) is a municipality in the district of Horgen in the canton of Zürich in Switzerland. Kilchberg is the site of a regional cemetery.

History

Kilchberg is first mentioned in 1248 as Hilchberch.  In 1250 it was mentioned as Kilchperch.  It grew out of the mediaeval village of Bendlikon (first mentioned in 1250 as Benklinkon) where Kilchberg was just a section of the village. Its coat of arms is Azure a Quatrefoil Argent seeded Or.

Geography

Of this area, 26.5% is used for agricultural purposes, while 1.9% is forested. Of the rest of the land, 71.2% is settled (buildings or roads) and the remainder (0.4%) is non-productive (rivers, glaciers or mountains).   housing and buildings made up 58.1% of the total area, while transportation infrastructure made up the rest (13.2%).   74.9% of the total municipal area was undergoing some type of construction.

Demographics

, 21.2% of the population was made up of foreign nationals.   the gender distribution of the population was 48.1% male and 51.9% female. Over the last 10 years the population has grown at a rate of 1.8% per annum. Most of the population speaks German  (84.0%), with English being second most common (4.1%) and Italian being third (2.8%).

In the 2007 national election the most popular party was the SVP which received 30.8% of the vote.  The next three most popular parties were the FDP (27.4%), the SPS (12.5%) and the CSP (10.2%).

The age distribution of the population is children and teenagers (0–19 years old) make up 17.2% of the population, while adults (20–64 years old) make up 63% and seniors (over 64 years old) make up 19.8%.  About 84.7% of the population (between age 25–64) have completed either non-mandatory upper secondary education or additional higher education (either university or a Fachhochschule).  There are 3,512 households in Kilchberg.

 there were 1928 Catholics and 2786 Protestants in Kilchberg. In the 2000 census, religion was broken down into several smaller categories. Of the rest of the population, 0% were Muslim, 6.3% belonged to another religion (not listed), 3.3% did not give a religion, and 17.3% were atheist or agnostic.

The historical population is given in the following table:

Industry

Kilchberg is home to the corporate headquarters of the confectioner Lindt & Sprüngli.

Kilchberg has an unemployment rate of 1.64%.  , there were 118 people employed in the primary economic sector and about 11 businesses involved in this sector.  1479 people are employed in the secondary sector and there are 48 businesses in this sector.  1983 people are employed in the tertiary sector, with 306 businesses in this sector.   65% of the working population were employed full-time, and 35% were employed part-time. Kilchberg is also the location of the private hospital Krankenhaus Sanitas.

Transport 
Kilchberg railway station is a stop of the S-Bahn Zürich on the lines S8 and S24 (4 per hour).

Kilchberg is connected to Zürich with bus line 161. Bus line 162 connects Kilchberg Spital with Kilchberg railway station and bus line 163 runs between Kilchberg, Obere Hornhalde and Kilchberg Railway station.

Tourist boat trips, run by the Zürichsee-Schifffahrtsgesellschaft, also sail from here to  Zürich and Rapperswil.

Education

Public schools

The public schools (primary and lower secondary school) are supervised by the commune's school board. The board consists of nine elected members.

Public school buildings:
Brunnenmoos A-C
Alte Landstrasse
Gemeindehaus
Dorfstrasse

Private, publicly subsidised schools

Other private schools

The Zürich International School (ZIS), an American curriculum private international school, has two campuses in Kilchberg: Early Childhood Center and Middle School Kilchberg. The American International School of Zurich was previously located in Kilchberg. The bureau for elementary school (Volksschulamt) of the canton of Zürich does not approve ZIS for its lower and upper secondary education (Sekundarstufe I aka Sekundarschule, and Sekundarstufe II aka Mittelschule). Therefore, its upper secondary school is not approved by the Swiss Federation, neither.

International relations

Kilchberg, Zürich is twinned with:

 Kilchberg district of Tübingen, Germany (since 1956)

Notable people 

 German author Thomas Mann made his home in Kilchberg when he returned to Europe after World War II, and is buried there.
 Swiss author Conrad Ferdinand Meyer was born in Zürich (October 11, 1825) and died in Kilchberg (November 28, 1898). In his honour, there is a C. F. Meyer museum in Kilchberg.
 Swiss-German chocolatier David Sprüngli-Schwartz and his son were born in Zürich but owned factories and died in Kilchberg.  Their chocolate company, Lindt & Sprüngli, is more commonly known as Lindt.

References

External links 

 Official website 
 
 Statistics 

Municipalities of the canton of Zürich
Populated places on Lake Zurich